Tonila is a town and municipality, in Jalisco in central-western Mexico.

Government

Municipal presidents

References

Municipalities of Jalisco